Neferkare VI Pepiseneb was an ancient Egyptian pharaoh of the Eighth Dynasty during the early First Intermediate Period (2181–2055 BC). According to the Egyptologists Kim Ryholt, Jürgen von Beckerath and Darrell Baker he was the twelfth king of the Eighth Dynasty.

Attestations
The name Neferkare VI Pepiseneb is attested on the Abydos King List (number 51), but not elsewhere. However, Jürgen von Beckerath has proposed that Neferkare Pepiseneb is to be identified with a "Neferkare Khered Seneb" appearing on the Turin canon. As such, Neferkare Pepiseneb would be the first king of the Eighth Dynasty, following Ntyiqrt (who might be Neitiqerty Siptah) whose name appears on the Turin canon, a large lacuna in the document affecting the intervening kings of the dynasty. Both of these sources are dated to long after the eighth dynasty, to the 19th dynasty and later and there are no contemporary attestations of this period.

Epithet
The epithet Khered given to Neferkare Pepiseneb in the Turin canon means "child" or "young". Consequently, "Neferkare Khered Seneb" is translated as Neferkare The Child is Healthy.

Several hypotheses have been put forth by Egyptologists concerning this epiteth. Hratch Papazian proposes that the fact that the king was called Khered on the Turin canon hints at his youthful age upon ascending to the throne. In reality, however, the epithet Khered always indicates that he had the same name as his father, making the only candidate for his father Neferkare II (as crown prince Neferkare (eldest son of Pepi II Neferkare), Neferkare III Neby, Neferkare IV Khendu, and Neferkare V Tereru all died unmarried and Pepi II Neferkare and crown prince Neferkare were members of the 6th dynasty).

Reign
According to Ryholt's latest reading of the Turin canon, Neferkare VI Pepiseneb reigned at least one year. As all pharaohs from Menkare until Neferkahor all had very short reigns (all within the year 2181 BC) and Neferkare VI Pepiseneb died in 2171 BC, he must have reigned 10 years (2181-2171 BC).

References

Smith, W. Stevenson. The Old Kingdom in Egypt and the Beginning of the First Intermediate Period, in The Cambridge Ancient History, vol. I, part 2, ed. Edwards, I.E.S, et al. p. 197. Cambridge University Press, New York, 1971.

22nd-century BC Pharaohs
Pharaohs of the Eighth Dynasty of Egypt